Stiretrus anchorago, commonly known as the anchor stink bug, is a species of predatory stink bug in the family Pentatomidae. It is found in Central America and North America. It is known to prey upon Epilachna varivestis and Hypera postica.

Subspecies
These five subspecies belong to the species Stiretrus anchorago:
 Stiretrus anchorago anchorago (Fabricius, 1775) i c g
 Stiretrus anchorago diana (Fabricius, 1803) i c g
 Stiretrus anchorago fimbriatus (Say, 1828) i c g
 Stiretrus anchorago personatus Germar, 1839 i c g
 Stiretrus anchorago violaceus (Say, 1828) i c g
Data sources: i = ITIS, c = Catalogue of Life, g = GBIF, b = Bugguide.net

References

Further reading

External links

 

Asopinae
Articles created by Qbugbot
Insects described in 1775
Taxa named by Johan Christian Fabricius